Domenico Zampaglione (born 21 February 1986) is an Italian footballer who most recently played for Roccella.

Biography
Born in Messina, Sicily, Zampaglione started his career on the other side of Strait of Messina, at Reggina Calcio. He then left for Serie D teams Trento, Scillese and Calabrian team Vibonese. He finished as the losing side of promotion play-offs in 2006 but promoted to Serie C2 to replace bankrupted teams. In 2008–09 Serie D he played for HinterReggio and in July 2009 returned to Seconda Divisione (ex- Serie C2) for Colligiana. However, in mid-season he returned to Reggio Calabria for HinterReggio. In 2010–11 Serie D he changed to play for Valle Grecanica, newly promoted from Eccellenza Calabria. He scored an impressive 0.86 goals per games and was signed by Serie A team Chievo at the end of season.

In July 2011 he was loaned to Prima Divisione newcomer Latina. He made his debut in the first round of 2011–12 Coppa Italia. On 3 January 2012 Zampaglione left for fourth division club Aversa.

He returned to HinterReggio again in July 2012 in co-ownership deal for a peppercorn of €500. In January 2013 he left for Vigor Lamezia Calcio in a temporary deal. In June 2013 Chievo gave up the remain 50% registration rights.

On 24 July 2013 he remained for Lamezia for another season.

References

External links
 
 Football.it Profile 
 
 LaSerieD.com Profile 

Italian footballers
Reggina 1914 players
U.S. Vibonese Calcio players
A.S.D. Olimpia Colligiana players
Latina Calcio 1932 players
Association football forwards
Serie C players
Sportspeople from Messina
1986 births
Living people
Footballers from Sicily